Ogden Mill is a Canadian rural community in Westmorland County, New Brunswick. Located in the Sackville Parish approximately 2 kilometres southwest of Sackville

History

Notable people

See also
List of communities in New Brunswick

References

Communities in Westmorland County, New Brunswick